Yndolaciidae is a family of polychaetes belonging to the order Phyllodocida.

Genera:
 Paryndolacia Buzhinskaja, 2004
 Yndolacia Støp-Bowitz, 1987
 Yndolaciella Buzhinskaja, 2004

References

Phyllodocida